Abhishek Das may refer to:

Abhishek Das (footballer)
Abhishek Das (cricketer)